The 2019 Navarrese regional election was held on Sunday, 26 May 2019, to elect the 10th Parliament of the Chartered Community of Navarre. All 50 seats in the Parliament were up for election. The election was held simultaneously with regional elections in eleven other autonomous communities and local elections all throughout Spain, as well as the 2019 European Parliament election.

Ahead of the election, the three main right-from-centre parties—namely, Navarrese People's Union (UPN), the People's Party (PP) and Citizens (Cs)—signed an electoral alliance under the Navarra Suma (NA+) brand, in order to maximize their options against the incumbent government, formed by Geroa Bai (GBai), EH Bildu and Izquierda-Ezkerra (I–E) with external support from Podemos, which in the previous election had ousted UPN from power after 19 years of uninterrupted rule. Concurrently, the Socialist Party of Navarre (PSN–PSOE) under María Chivite was on the rise, benefitting from a national bandwagon effect for the party following the general election held only one month earlier, on 28 April.

The election saw a victory for the NA+ alliance, which was able to secure more seats than the incumbent government (20 to 19). In particular, the collapse in the Podemos's vote share benefitted the PSN–PSOE, which scored its best result since 2007. There was speculation that UPN would be able to access the regional government through an agreement or consent from the PSN, but Chivite opted instead to secure the support of GBai, Podemos and I–E, as well as EH Bildu's tactical abstention, to become the first Socialist president of Navarre since Javier Otano stepped down from the office in 1996.

Overview

Electoral system
The Parliament of Navarre was the devolved, unicameral legislature of the Chartered Community of Navarre, having legislative power in regional matters as defined by the Spanish Constitution and the Reintegration and Enhancement of the Foral Regime of Navarre Law, as well as the ability to vote confidence in or withdraw it from a regional president.

Voting was on the basis of universal suffrage, which comprised all nationals over 18 years of age, registered in Navarre and in full enjoyment of their political rights. Additionally, Navarrese people abroad were required to apply for voting before being permitted to vote, a system known as "begged" or expat vote. The 50 members of the Parliament of Navarre were elected using the D'Hondt method and a closed list proportional representation, with a threshold of three percent of valid votes—which included blank ballots—being applied regionally. Parties not reaching the threshold were not taken into consideration for seat distribution.

Election date
The term of the Parliament of Navarre expired four years after the date of its previous election, unless it was dissolved earlier. The election decree was required to be issued no later than the twenty-fifth day prior to the date of expiry of parliament and published on the following day in the Official Gazette of Navarre (BON), with election day taking place on the fifty-fourth day from publication. The previous election was held on 24 May 2015, which meant that the legislature's term would have expired on 24 May 2019. The election decree was required to be published in the BON no later than 30 April 2019, with the election taking place on the fifty-fourth day from publication, setting the latest possible election date for the Parliament on Sunday, 23 June 2019.

The president had the prerogative to dissolve the Parliament of Navarre and call a snap election, provided that no motion of no confidence was in process, no nationwide election was due and some time requirements were met: namely, that dissolution did not occur either during the first legislative session or within the legislature's last year ahead of its scheduled expiry, nor before one year had elapsed since a previous dissolution under this procedure. In the event of an investiture process failing to elect a regional president within a three-month period from the election date, the Parliament was to be automatically dissolved and a fresh election called.

Parliamentary composition
The Parliament of Navarre was officially dissolved on 2 April 2019, after the publication of the dissolution decree in the Official Gazette of Navarre. The table below shows the composition of the parliamentary groups in the Parliament at the time of dissolution.

Parties and candidates
The electoral law allowed for parties and federations registered in the interior ministry, coalitions and groupings of electors to present lists of candidates. Parties and federations intending to form a coalition ahead of an election were required to inform the relevant Electoral Commission within ten days of the election call, whereas groupings of electors needed to secure the signature of at least one percent of the electorate in Navarre, disallowing electors from signing for more than one list of candidates.

Below is a list of the main parties and electoral alliances which contested the election:

Opinion polls
The tables below list opinion polling results in reverse chronological order, showing the most recent first and using the dates when the survey fieldwork was done, as opposed to the date of publication. Where the fieldwork dates are unknown, the date of publication is given instead. The highest percentage figure in each polling survey is displayed with its background shaded in the leading party's colour. If a tie ensues, this is applied to the figures with the highest percentages. The "Lead" column on the right shows the percentage-point difference between the parties with the highest percentages in a poll.

Voting intention estimates
The table below lists weighted voting intention estimates. Refusals are generally excluded from the party vote percentages, while question wording and the treatment of "don't know" responses and those not intending to vote may vary between polling organisations. When available, seat projections determined by the polling organisations are displayed below (or in place of) the percentages in a smaller font; 26 seats were required for an absolute majority in the Parliament of Navarre.

Voting preferences
The table below lists raw, unweighted voting preferences.

Victory preferences
The table below lists opinion polling on the victory preferences for each party in the event of a regional election taking place.

Results

Aftermath

Investiture processes to elect the president of the Government of Navarre required for an absolute majority—more than half the votes cast—to be obtained in the first ballot. If unsuccessful, a new ballot would be held 24 hours later requiring only of a simple majority—more affirmative than negative votes—to succeed. If such majorities were not achieved, successive candidate proposals would be processed under the same procedure. In the event of the investiture process failing to elect a regional president within a three-month period from the election date, the Parliament would be automatically dissolved and a snap election called.

Notes

References
Opinion poll sources

Other

2019 in Navarre
Navarre
Regional elections in Navarre
May 2019 events in Spain